The University of Plymouth Contemporary Music Festival is held in Plymouth, Devon, England. It has a program of leading-edge orchestral, operatic, jazz, and electroacoustic performances, along with film, and music theatre. Composers and performers who have been part of the festival include BBC Singers, David J. Peterson, Michael Stimpson, Evelyn Glennie, Sally Beamish, liminal, Jem Finer, the Maggini string quartet, Dominic Murcott, Eduardo Reck Miranda, John Matthias, Plaid, Alexis Kirke and Jonty Harrison.

External links 
 Contemporary Music Festival Website
 ICCMR Contemporary Music Festival Website

Music festivals in Devon